In enzymology, a trihydroxystilbene synthase is an enzyme that catalyzes the chemical reaction

3 malonyl-CoA + 4-coumaroyl-CoA  4 CoA + 3,4',5-trihydroxy-stilbene + 4 CO2

Thus, the two substrates of this enzyme are malonyl-CoA and 4-coumaroyl-CoA, whereas its 3 products are CoA, 3,4',5-trihydroxy-stilbene (resveratrol), and CO2.

This enzyme belongs to the family of transferases, To be specific those acyltransferases transferring groups other than aminoacyl groups.  The systematic name of this enzyme class is malonyl-CoA:4-coumaroyl-CoA malonyltransferase (cyclizing). Other names in common use include resveratrol synthase, and stilbene synthase.  This enzyme participates in phenylpropanoid biosynthesis.

Structural studies 

References

Further reading 

 

EC 2.3.1
Enzymes of known structure
Hydroxycinnamic acids metabolism
Stilbenoids metabolism